Hyo-rin is a Korean feminine given name. 

People with this name include:
Hyolyn (born 1990), real name Kim Hyo-jung, South Korean singer, member of Sistar
Min Hyo-rin (born 1986), real name Jung Eun-ran, South Korean actress and singer

See also
List of Korean given names

Korean feminine given names